Brynley Alexandra Stent (born 1989) is a New Zealand actor, comedian and scriptwriter.
She appeared on the first season of the New Zealand adaptation of Taskmaster and played the character Kelly-Anne Johnson on long running New Zealand soap opera Shortland Street. She won the 2021 Billy T Award for best breakthrough comedian for her show Soft Carnage.

Stent studied drama at Toi Whakaari in Wellington, New Zealand, graduating in 2013 with a Bachelor of Performing Arts in Acting. She appeared as the recurring Gloriavale character Providence Gratitude in Three's Jono and Ben, alongside Rose Matafeo and Laura Daniel in Three's Funny Girls, in 2020 sitcom Golden Boy, and acts regularly on stage for Auckland Theatre Company.

In August 2021, it was announced that she would feature in the 2021 Season of 
Celebrity Treasure Island 2021 with her flatmate/contestant Chris Parker.

In August 2022, she appeared on the Surprise replacement boss, a video edited by Viva La Dirt League as part of their Bored series.

In 2023, Stent appeared on Guy Montgomery's Guy Mont-Spelling Bee.

References

External links 

 

1989 births
Living people
New Zealand comedians
New Zealand women comedians
New Zealand television actresses
21st-century New Zealand actresses
Toi Whakaari alumni